The Fetsund Booms are a Norwegian national cultural heritage monument, log driving museum, and wetland center at the outlet of the Glomma River into Lake Øyeren in Fetsund in Viken county. The Fetsund Booms were set up as a timber sorting facility in 1861 and operated until 1985, when log driving came to an end on the Glomma River. Today the facility is part of the Akershus Museum.

The millennium site for the municipality of Fetsund is located next to the Vinkelen building at the facility.

History
Log driving on the Glomma River began in the 1300s, but increased when frame saws were introduced in the 16th century. In the beginning, the timber was tied together in the Glomma River at the Bingen Booms at Sørumsand. From there, the timber rafts were towed by boats to the many sawmills along the lake and in Lillestrøm. When the railway bridge in Fetsund was built in 1861, the booms at Bingen were moved to Fetsund. At Bingen, catch booms were set up that could release timber as needed at Fetsund.

Today the Fetsund Booms are protected as Norway's only remaining log-driving facility. The Fetsund Booms are also believed to be the only preserved log-driving facility of their kind in the world. They are preserved as outstanding cultural heritage and a living museum with workshops for traditional crafts, cafes, and museum shops. The Fetsund Booms are located in an attractive natural area at the entrance to northern Europe's largest inland delta. There is also a nature trail with cultural highlights in the area.

References

External links

 Fetsund Booms website
 To millioner tømmerstokker ved Sørumsand og Fetsund (Two Million Pieces of Timber at Sørumsand and Fetsund; silent film)
 Historical photos of the Fetsund Booms at the National Library of Norway
 Fetsund Booms at Kulturminnesøk

Museums in Viken
Fet
Timber rafting
Listed buildings and structures in Norway
Cultural heritage of Norway
1861 establishments in Norway